MEA or Mea may refer to:

Education 
 Minnesota Education Association
 MEA Engineering College, Perinthalmanna
 Michigan Education Association

Fictional characters 
 Mea (Popotan), a maid for three sisters in the visual novel Popotan
 Mea Kurosaki, a transformation weapon in the manga series To Love Ru Darkness
 Mea 3, a representative of planet Eminiar VII in the Star Trek episode "A Taste of Armageddon"

Organizations
 Manx Electricity Authority
 ME Association, a British organization providing information and support on ME/CFS
 Metropolitan Electricity Authority, responsible for supplying the Bangkok Metropolitan Region
 Middle East Airlines, the flag carrier airline of Lebanon
 Municipal Employees' Association, former British trade union

Politics 
 Multilateral Environmental Agreement
 Ministry of External Affairs (disambiguation), several

Science 
 Mea (moth), a genus of moths
 Mean electrical axis, in electrocardiography
 Means–ends analysis a paradigm for automated problem solving
 Microelectrode array, a device to record or stimulate electrophysiological activity from neurons or other cells
 Millennium Ecosystem Assessment
 Membrane electrode assembly, part of a PEM fuel cell
 Mercaptoethylamine-2 or cysteamine, an organic chemical compound
 Monoethanolamine, an organic chemical compound
 Mind Evolutionary Algorithm in statistics

Other uses
 Mea language
 Malt extract agar, a selective growth medium which is a combination of yeast and mold.
 Metropolitan Employment Area, a type of division of Japan
 Line A (Rome Metro), Metropolitana A
 Minimum en route altitude, the recommended minimum altitude for a segment of an airway
The Middle East and Africa, a variation of Europe, the Middle East and Africa
 Mughal-e-Azam, an Indian film
 Mass Effect: Andromeda, a 2017 video game

Persons with the surname
 Ivan Della Mea (1940-2009), Italian singer
 Gari Mea (born 1976), Papua New Guinean cricketer
 Lara Della Mea (born 1999), Italian skier